Ship Inn is a historic inn and tavern located in West Whiteland Township, Chester County, Pennsylvania. It was built in 1796, and is a two-story, six bay, Georgian style stone building with brick chimneys.  The main block measures 50 feet by 37 feet, with a rear kitchen wing measuring 29 feet by 20 feet.  It remained in operation as an inn until 1854.  In the 20th century, a restaurant opened in the building.

It was listed on the National Register of Historic Places in 1984.

References

Hotel buildings on the National Register of Historic Places in Pennsylvania
Georgian architecture in Pennsylvania
Hotel buildings completed in 1796
Buildings and structures in Chester County, Pennsylvania
National Register of Historic Places in Chester County, Pennsylvania
1796 establishments in Pennsylvania